Star Mills is an unincorporated community in Hardin County, Kentucky, United States.

References

Unincorporated communities in Hardin County, Kentucky
Unincorporated communities in Kentucky